Automation Studio is a circuit design, simulation and project documentation software for fluid power systems and electrical projects conceived by Famic Technologies Inc.. It is used for CAD, maintenance, and training purposes. Mainly used by engineers, trainers, and service and maintenance personnel. Automation Studio can be applied in the design, training and troubleshooting of hydraulics, pneumatics, HMI, and electrical control systems.

Two versions of the software exist:
 Automation Studio Professional
 Automation Studio Educational

The educational version of Automation Studio is a limited features version used by engineering and technical schools to train students who are future engineers or technicians. The software is designed for schools that teach technical subjects such as industrial technologies, mechatronics, electromechanical technologies, electrical & electronics, automation, and maintenance. Modeling and simulation are used to illustrate theoretical aspects.

Libraries
Automation Studio has various symbol libraries. All libraries follow standards such as ISO, IEC, JIC and NEMA.
 Hydraulics 
 Hydraulic Manifold Block 
 Pneumatics 
 Electrical (IEC & NEMA standards)
 Fluid Power & Electrical Component Sizing
 Valve Spool Designer
 OPC communications server
 Bill of Materials & Report
 PLC Ladder Logic
 HMI & Control Panel
 Digital Electronics
 Sequential Function Chart (GRAFCET)
 Electrical Controls
 Multi-Fluid Simulation
 Teachware
 Manufacturer's Catalogue
 Workflow Manager
 Block Diagram (Math) Workshop  
 CANBus
 Communication Interface with Unity 3D
 System Analysis (FMECA)

Libraries features
Automation Studio is used as a design and simulation tool in the fields of hydraulics, pneumatics, electrical and automation.

Automation Studio Hydraulics

Automation Studio Hydraulics’ functions are used for hydraulic system engineering purposes. Automation Studio Hydraulics includes a specific symbol library and uses modeling techniques such the Bernoulli's law and the gradient method.

Automation Studio Hydraulics is the main aspect of Automation Studio: it is used to conceive and to test hydraulic systems while  taking into account thermal parameters. It displays inside views of the elements in the schematics. The Automation Studio library includes additional elements such as commands and control devices (PID controller, CAN bus, and servo-direction).

Fluid power is one of the central elements in such simulation.

Automation Studio Pneumatics

Automation Studio Pneumatics is similar to Automation Studio Hydraulics, but the simulation is done for air rather than fluids. This library, like Automation Studio Hydraulics, is used to design and test models.

Thus, the simulation elements that are used are not the same as those in the hydraulics library.

Automation Studio Electrotechnical

The electrotechnical module in Automation Studio is used for design, simulation, validation, documentation and troubleshooting of electrical diagrams. It includes multi-line and one-line representation according to the users' choice. The different aspects of the IEC and NEMA international standards are respected: components’ identification, symbols, ratings, ports names, ... etc.

The electrotechnical module works simultaneously with the fluid power technologies which allows the users to design and simulate complete systems.

Versions

Automation Studio Professional
 1996-2000: 1.0 to 3.0.5.1 (Windows 98, 2000, Me, XP, NT 4.0);
 2003-2004: 4.0, 4.1, 5.0, 5.1, 5.2 (Windows 2000, XP, NT 4.0);
 2005-2006: 5.3, 5.4 (Windows 2000, 2003, XP);
 2007: 5.5 (Windows XP, Vista);
 2008: 5.6 (Windows XP, Vista);
 2009: 5.7 (Windows XP, Vista);
 2011: 6.0 (Windows XP, Windows 7, Windows 8);
 2014: 6.1 (Windows 7, Windows 8);
 2016: 6.2 (Windows 7, Windows 8, Windows 10, Vista);
 2017: 6.3 (Windows 7, Windows 8, Windows 10, Vista);
 2019: 6.4 with service release (SR) 1, SR2, SR3(Windows 7, Windows 8, Windows 10, Vista);
 2021: 7.0 with SR1 and SR2 (Windows 8.1, Windows 10);
 2022: 7.1 with SR1 (win10, win11);

Automation Studio Educational
 2002-2005: 4.0, 4.1, 5.0, 5.1, 5.2 (Windows 2000, XP, NT 4.0);
 2006: 5.3 (Windows 2000, 2003, XP);
 2008: 5.6 (Windows XP, Vista);
 2009: 5.7 (Windows XP, Vista);
 2014: 6.1 (Windows 7, Windows 8);
 2016: 6.2 (Windows 7, Windows 8, Windows 10, Vista);
 2017: 6.3 (Windows 7, Windows 8, Windows 10, Vista);
 2019: 6.4 (Windows 7, Windows 8, Windows 10, Vista);
 2021: 7.0 (Windows 8.1, Windows 10);
 2022: 7.1 with SR1 (win10, win11);

External links
 Automation Studio Professional Edition
 Automation Studio Educational Edition

References

Simulation software